The 1990 Richmond Spiders football team was an American football team that represented the University of Richmond as a member of the Yankee Conference during the 1990 NCAA Division I-AA football season. In their second season under head coach Jim Marshall, Richmond compiled a 1–10 record, with a mark of 1–7 in conference play, finishing in ninth place in the Yankee.

Schedule

References

Richmond
Richmond Spiders football seasons
Richmond Spiders